Antigonos (before 1928: Κιοσελέρ - Kioseler) is a village in Florina Regional Unit, Macedonia, Greece.

The Greek census (1920) recorded 1174 people in the village and in 1923 there were 1100 inhabitants who were Muslim. Following the Greek-Turkish population exchange, in 1926 within Kioseler there were refugee families from East Thrace (13), Asia Minor (129) and Pontus (6). The Greek census (1928) recorded 619 village inhabitants. There were 148 refugee families (595 people) in 1928.

References 

Populated places in Florina (regional unit)

Amyntaio